Alfred G. Mayer (Alfred Goldsborough Mayor; April 16, 1868 – June 24, 1922) was an American marine biologist and zoologist, whose fascination with medusae (jellyfish) marked a turning point for biology. Despite Mayor's interest in the sea, his first voyage began during his twenty-fourth year of life. Because of his German 'heritage', "[...]he altered it (his last name) to "Mayor" in order to dissociate himself from his Germanic roots". Mayor is also greatly known for his many publications and papers in which he wrote about topics ranging from physics to hunting and fishing.

Education
Mayor was born in Frederick, Maryland, the son of Katherine Duckett (Goldsborough) and Alfred Marshall Mayer. He was of part German descent. Dropping out from school at age sixteen, he began to work in a machinist's shop.  To please the request of his father, Alfred enrolled in the Stevens Institute of Technology.  After many years of physics-related work in several universities, Mayor left his position to pursue a career in natural history, a great interest of his.  Professor Lucian I. Blake, one of Mayor's many mentors and professor of University of Kansas, stated that," [Alfred was] successful in Physics,...his true taste and longings were toward natural history."  In 1897, he graduated from Harvard University with a Sc.D.

Career
Mayor's most recognized work originated from his work as a successful marine biologist.  He published his first book about jellyfish in 1910 titled Medusae of the World, which documented his many studies of species of jellyfish around the world.

In 1907 Mayor founded the Tortugas Laboratory on Garden Key (today Fort Jefferson National Monument), maintained by the Carnegie Institution for Science, where each summer marine biologists studied the life of the coral reef. Mayor died on nearby Loggerhead Key, Dry Tortugas, aged 54.

With his wife, artist and sculptor Harriet Randolph Hyatt Mayor, Mayor was the father of art historian A. Hyatt Mayor, and the great-grandfather of actress Yeardley Smith.

Works
 Rhythmical pulsation in Scyphomedusae, 1906
 Medusae of the World, 1910

Species named after Mayer
 Ectopleura mayeri Petersen, 1990
 Rissoina mayori Dall, 1925
 Eutiara mayeri Bigelow, 1918
 Melicertissa mayeri Kramp, 1959
 Lobonema mayeri Light, 1914
 Coeloseris mayeri Vaughan, 1918
 Porites mayeri Vaughan, 1918
 likely Gadila mayori Henderson, 1920

References

External links

 Alfred Goldsborough Mayer on www.tmbl.gu.se

American entomologists
Cnidariologists
1868 births
1922 deaths
Stevens Institute of Technology alumni
Harvard University alumni
Mayer family